Cindy Nelles (born August 19, 1993) is a Canadian rugby union player who plays lock for Canterbury of the Farah Palmer Cup and the Canada women's national rugby union team. She has played for her national side at the 2014 Women's Rugby World Cup, where she won a silver medal as an injury replacement, and the 2017 Women's Rugby World Cup. Nelles has played for Canada 19 times. She was a successful rugby union player at college level, winning McMaster University's first CIS rugby union title as well as multiple awards and honours. Nelles helped Canterbury to win the 2020 Farah Palmer Cup. She works as a civil engineer while continuing her rugby career.

Biography
Nelles' birth was on August 19, 1993. She was raised in Belleville, Ontario. Nelles was educated at St. Theresa Catholic Secondary School, graduating in mid-2011. She matriculated to McMaster University in Hamilton, Ontario, studying civil engineering. She graduated with honours in 2016. She plays in the lock position in rugby union, and is employed as a civil engineer in New Zealand while continuing her rugby career. Nelles was a spokesperson for Bell Let's Talk promoting mental health problem awareness.

As a child, Nelles played football, ice hockey and volleyball. She took up touch rugby with the Belleville Bulldogs youth program at age 10, after receiving encouragement from her father. She grew fond of rugby, playing the sport at the high school, provincial, and age grade levels. Nelles made her debut at the international level for Canada at the four-game 2011 Under 20s Nations Cup in Santa Barbara, California, placing third out of four teams with a 2–2 record. She was supported by capital that had been raised by her friends, family, sponsors, and an organized barbecue bash. Nelles captained the McMaster Marauders rugby union women's team. She was named the 2011 Russell Division Rookie of the Year. In her 2013 season, Nelles scored eight tries, accumulating 44 points in five regular-season competitions. This placed her seventh in the Ontario University Athletics player rankings, and was named to the OUA Russell Division All-Star Team and as a CIS All-Canadian selection.

In 2015, Nelles achieved two tries in winning the CIS Championship in Kingston, Ontario for McMaster for the first time ever, earning her CIS Player of the Year and CIS Player of the Tournament honours. She was named the recipient of the Therese Quigley Award as McMaster Marauders Female Athlete of the Year.  Nelles also won the 2015 Robinson-Kelleher Memorial Award as the Athlete of the Year for Belleville in May 2016. She was the first rugby player to earn the accolade. Nelles earned the Americas Rugby Breakout Player of the Year Award from North and South America over three male players. She was named to the Dean's Honour List three times from 2014 to 2016, three-time Marauder Scholar Award winner between 2013 and 2016, and a former winner of the Ronald V. Joyce Award for Combining Outstanding Athletic and Academic Performance. Nelles was employed as head coach for the senior girl's rugby club of Westdale Secondary School for its spring season.

She spent one year away from rugby to allow herself to recover from injury and then began to train with her fellow Canadian players. Nelles was selected to be head coach of the Toronto-based Elites Reds club. Not long after, she relocated to Christchurch, New Zealand to take up a career in semi-professional rugby. Nelles offered her services to the local provincial rugby union for the 2018 domestic season but did not get a response. She played club rugby for a short period before joining defending Farah Palmer Cup winners Canterbury. On October 31, 2020, the final of the 2020 Farah Palmer Cup, Nelles helped Canterbury win its fourth provincial title in succession when she scored a match-winning try on 81 minutes to beat Waikato 8–7 in Christchurch.

At the international level, she made her debut for the Canada Maple Leafs senior women's developmental national team as captain on a two-match tour of England. She was called up as an injury replacement for flanker Barbara Mervin in the Canada women's national silver-medal side in the last three weeks of the 2014 Women's Rugby World Cup, which lost 21–9 to England in the final. Nelles played for the Canada women's national rugby union team at the 2015 Women's Rugby Super Series in Alberta. Nelles was named as one of 25 players to Canada's 2017 Can Am rugby team for the series held in San Diego after doing a one-week training camp in Vancouver Island. She went on to play three matches for Canada at the 2017 Women's Rugby World Cup, scoring a single second-half semi-final try against Wales to finish in fifth position. Overall, Nelles has played for the national Canada team 19 times. In November 2020, she was named to the New Zealand Barbarians team that lost 19–17 to the New Zealand national side at Trafalgar Park, Nelson.

References

1993 births
Living people
Sportspeople from Belleville, Ontario
McMaster University alumni
20th-century Canadian women
21st-century Canadian women
Canadian female rugby union players
Canada women's international rugby union players
Rugby union locks